Frederic "Freddie" Deschênes (born January 12, 1976) is a Canadian former professional ice hockey goaltender.

Juniors
Deschênes started his career in the QMJHL as a member of the Granby Bisons, who were later known as the Prédateurs. As a member of the Prédateurs during the 1995-96 season, Deschênes won several awards from the CHL, including being named CHL's First Team All-Star. Deschênes also had the lowest goals against average in the QMJHL, which earned him the Jacques Plante Trophy. During the Memorial Cup tournament in 1996, Deschênes was the only goaltender to ever post two shutouts in the same tournament

Professional
Despite being drafted by the Detroit Red Wings in 1994, Deschênes did not see any ice time with the club. Instead, Deschênes rotated through six different teams between the IHL, AHL, and the ECHL. Deschênes signed with the Johnstown Chiefs in the summer of 1999 and stayed with the team until 2002. Nicknamed "The Franchise" by Chiefs' management, Deschênes led the Chiefs to the postseason for the first time in five seasons and appeared in the playoffs in each of his three seasons with the team. During his tenure with the Chiefs, Deschênes also set several all-time and single season team records.

Deschênes returned to Quebec in 2002 and continued his career with Thetford Mines Prolab of the Quebec Semi-Pro Hockey League. He won 29 of a possible 34 games during the 2002-03 season, going 29-4-1 with a 2.10 GAA and a .927 save percentage. Deschênes remained with Thetford Mines until 2008.

He signed with Saint-Georges CRS Express in 2008 and recently won the Futura Cup as a member of the Express in 2010.

Awards

CHL
First All-Star Team (1995–1996)
Goaltender of the Year (1995–1996)
Most Outstanding Goaltender, Memorial Cup (1995–1996)

QMJHL
Jacques Plante Memorial Trophy, (1995–1996)

Records

Memorial Cup
Shutouts (single season): 2 (1995–96)

Johnstown Chiefs
Appearances (all-time): 152 (1999–2002)
Shutouts (all-time): 5 (1999–2002)
Shutouts (post-season): 3 (1999–2002)
Wins (all-time): 69 (1999–2002)
Wins (single-season): 25 (tie) (2001–2002, since broken by Ryan Nie during 2007-08 season)

LNAH
Shutouts (single-season): 4 (2002–03)

External links

EliteProspects.com: Frederic Deschênes Player Profile Page
NHL.com: Frederic Deschênes Player Bio

References

1976 births
Birmingham Bulls (ECHL) players
Canadian ice hockey goaltenders
Detroit Red Wings draft picks
Flint Generals players
French Quebecers
Granby Bisons players
Granby Prédateurs players
Johnstown Chiefs players
Living people
Orlando Solar Bears (IHL) players
Portland Pirates players
Quebec Rafales players
Rochester Americans players
Saint-Georges Cool FM 103.5 players
Thetford Assurancia players
Ice hockey people from Quebec City
Canadian expatriate ice hockey players in the United States